Baburino is a rural locality (a village) in Kovarditskoye Rural Settlement, Muromsky District, Vladimir Oblast, Russia. The population was 4 as of 2010.

Geography 
Baburino is located 32 km northwest of Murom (the district's administrative centre) by road. Dyakonovo is the nearest rural locality.

References 

Rural localities in Muromsky District
Muromsky Uyezd